Morula aspera is a species of sea snail, a marine gastropod mollusk in the family Muricidae, the murex snails or rock snails.

Description
The shell size is between 11 mm and 17 mm

Distribution
This species is found along South East Africa and Japan.

References

 Dautzenberg, Ph. (1929). Mollusques testaces marins de Madagascar. Faune des Colonies Francaises, Tome III

External links
 

aspera
Gastropods described in 1816